Seo Jang-hoon (born 3 June 1974) is a South Korean former professional basketball player, who is currently active as an entertainer and variety show star.

Early life
Seo attended Whimoon High School, known as one Seoul's high school basketball powerhouses, alongside close friend Hyun Joo-yup. Their team drew attention as they measured an average height of 1.97 meters, around the height of their adult counterparts, despite being only teenagers.

Basketball career
Seo played college basketball for Yonsei University. His time at Yonsei coincided with what is often retrospectively dubbed the "golden era" of domestic college basketball and was referenced in the television series Reply 1994. He and his teammates, as well as their counterparts from traditional athletic rivals Korea University, enjoyed a level of popularity similar to that of idol singers and A-list actors/actresses due to their skills and good looks. Together with his future national teammates Yonsei counterparts Lee Sang-min, Moon Kyung-eun and Woo Ji-won and Korea University's Hyun Joo-yup, Chun Hee-chul and Shin Ki-sung among others, they were collectively dubbed "Oppa Troupe" (오빠부대) by the media.

By the end of Seo's college career, domestic basketball was transitioning into the professional era with the establishment of the Korean Basketball League. He was signed by Seoul SK Knights, then based in Cheongju, in 1998. That year he moved to Seoul Samsung Thunders and played for them until 2007. From 2007 to 2008, he played for Jeonju KCC Egis. In 2008 Seo went to Incheon Electroland Elephants, and played for them until his retirement in 2013.

In 1994, Seo was first called-up to the South Korean senior national team and played in the 1994 FIBA world cup. His team competed in the 1994 Asian Games and got second place. In 1997, his team played in the ABC World Basketball Tournament and won. 1998, He played in 1998 FIBA world cup. He was a mainstay of the team which won gold at the 2002 Asian Games. He took 4th place in 2005 FIBA Asian cup, and 5th place at the 2006 Asian Games.

In his prime, Seo was widely regarded as one of the greatest centers of his generation and was dubbed "National Treasure Center" (Korean: 국보급 센터) by fans and the media. A formidable rebounder and scorer, he held the league all-time record for rebounds (5235 in 688 games) until January 2022, when it was surpassed by Jeonju KCC Egis center-forward Ra Gun-ah. During the 1998–99 season, he led the league in rebounds (overall among both domestic and foreign players) and points (among domestic players); no other domestic player has simultaneously led the league in both a domestic and overall statistical category in a single season, until point guard Heo Hoon over two decades later.

Career statistics

Career averages

Entertainment career
After he retired from basketball, Seo began a career appearing on entertainment shows and was signed to Mystic Entertainment in 2013.
In 2015, he was a guest on the critically and commercially popular variety show Infinite Challenge. He won the 2015 SBS Entertainment Award for Rookie of the Year for his appearance in Flaming Youth.

He is a regular celebrity panelist on the singing competition show Fantastic Duo, which debuted on April 17, 2016. He is also a regular panelist on the talk show Same Bed, Different Dreams, and a permanent cast member of JTBC's Knowing Bros.

Personal life
On June 23, 2009, Seo married Oh Jeong-yeon, a television announcer. They divorced in 2012, after 3 years of marriage.

Filmography

TV Show

Awards and nominations

Listicles

References

External links
 Seo Jang-hoon's matches at Korean Basketball League

1974 births
Living people
Mystic Entertainment artists
South Korean men's basketball players
Seoul SK Knights players
Seoul Samsung Thunders players
Jeonju KCC Egis players
Daegu KOGAS Pegasus players
Changwon LG Sakers players
Suwon KT Sonicboom players
South Korea national basketball team players
Asian Games medalists in basketball
Basketball career
Basketball players at the 1998 Asian Games
Basketball players at the 2002 Asian Games
Basketball players at the 2006 Asian Games
Whimoon High School alumni
Yonsei University alumni
Asian Games gold medalists for South Korea
Asian Games silver medalists for South Korea
1998 FIBA World Championship players
Medalists at the 1994 Asian Games
Medalists at the 1998 Asian Games
Medalists at the 2002 Asian Games
1994 FIBA World Championship players
Best Variety Performer Male Paeksang Arts Award (television) winners